Richard Enright (May 20,1935-November 23, 2021) was a former American football player and coach.  He was the head coach at the University of Oregon in 1972 and 1973, with a record of 6–16. Enright was a three-year letterman as a lineman at the University of Southern California.

Gardena High School
Prior to his time at Oregon, Enright was the head coach at Gardena High School, his alma mater, and won the CIF Los Angeles City Section football championship in 1969. After his college days at USC, he was a fifth round pick in the 1957 NFL Draft (57th overall) and was briefly with the Los Angeles Rams, until an automobile accident ended his playing days.

Oregon
Enright moved to the college ranks as the offensive line coach for the Oregon Ducks of the Pac-8 in 1970, under head coach Jerry Frei, and took over as head coach in February 1972, with a four-year contract starting at $22,500 per year. As head coach, Enright helped develop quarterback Dan Fouts, a senior during the 1972 season, and Norv Turner was the QB in 1973. With season records of 4–7 and 2–9, Enright was fired by athletic director Norv Ritchey in January 1974, with the university buying out the remainder of his four-year contract. He was succeeded by one of his assistant coaches, Don Read.

While head coach, Enright created the Daisy Ducks, an Oregon support club aimed at women. He claimed he created the organization because he was tired of complaints that men could not get their wives to attend football games because they did not understand the sport; the club proved popular. At the inaugural luncheon in August 1972, sophomore tight end Russ Francis did a "reverse striptease" to show the protective gear of a football player.

WFL and NFL
After Oregon, Enright was hired by Tom Fears in April 1974 to coach the offensive line of the Southern California Sun of the short-lived professional World Football League. The league folded during the 1975 season, and Enright joined the San Francisco 49ers in 1976 as OL coach under new head coach Monte Clark, a college teammate.

Return to high school
Enright later became head coach at Capistrano Valley High School, a public school in Mission Viejo, California.  During this time, Enright's old USC alum and friend Marv Marinovich decided to have his son, quarterback Todd Marinovich transfer to Capistrano Valley to play under Enright.  Todd, already a highly touted high school player, flourished and broke the all-time Orange County passing record and later the national high school passing record with 9,914 yards, including 2,477 his senior year.

Head coaching record

College

References

1935 births
Living people
American football offensive linemen
Oregon Ducks football coaches
San Francisco 49ers coaches
USC Trojans football players
Southern California Sun coaches
High school football coaches in California
Players of American football from Los Angeles
Sports coaches from Los Angeles